Głównica is a river of Poland. It flows from the lake Wicko to the Baltic Sea near Jarosławiec.

Rivers of Poland
Rivers of West Pomeranian Voivodeship
1Głównica